Kim Jin-uk (born July 5, 2002) is a Korean professional baseball pitcher for the Lotte Giants of the KBO League.

The Lotte Giants selected Kim with the first selection of the 2021 KBO League draft, and he made his debut for Lotte that year. He was selected for the South Korean national baseball team for the 2020 Summer Olympics, which begin in July 2021.

References

External links

 Career statistics and player information from Korea Baseball Organization

Living people
2002 births
People from Pyeongtaek
KBO League pitchers
Lotte Giants players
Baseball players at the 2020 Summer Olympics
Olympic baseball players of South Korea
Sportspeople from Gyeonggi Province
South Korean expatriate baseball players in Australia